Kulaku (also Romanized as Kūlakū; also known as Kallūkī, Koolookoo, Kor Koh, Kor Kūh, Kūlkūh, Kūlūkū, and Kūlū Kūh) is a village in Sangan Rural District, in the Central District of Khash County, Sistan and Baluchestan Province, Iran. At the 2006 census, its population was 329, in 55 families.

References 

Populated places in Khash County